Bünyadlı (also, Buniyatly, and Bunyadly) is a village and municipality in the Beylagan Rayon of Azerbaijan.  It has a population of 2,270.

References 

Populated places in Beylagan District